Verkhoyansk (Verxoyanskay) is a town in Verkhoyansky District of the Sakha Republic, Russia, located on the Yana River in the Arctic Circle,  from Batagay, the administrative center of the district, and  north of Yakutsk, the capital of the Sakha republic. As of the 2010 Census, its population was 1,311. The cold record is shared with Oymyakon.

History
The ostrog's name "Verkhoyansky", roughly translating from Russian as the town on the Upper Yana, derived from its geographical location on the upper reaches of the Yana River. In 1775, it was moved to the left bank of the Yana River to facilitate tax collection. It was granted town status in 1817. Between the 1860s and 1917, the town was a place of political exile, with some of the more prominent exiles including the Polish writer Wacław Sieroszewski, as well as Bolshevik revolutionaries Ivan Babushkin and Viktor Nogin.

Administrative and municipal status
As an inhabited locality, Verkhoyansk is classified as a town under district jurisdiction. Within the framework of administrative divisions, it is incorporated within Verkhoyansky District as the Town of Verkhoyansk. As a municipal division, the Town of Verkhoyansk is incorporated within Verkhoyansky Municipal District as Verkhoyansk Urban Settlement.

Economy and infrastructure 
There is a river port, an airport, a fur-collecting depot, and the center of a reindeer-raising area.

Geography 
Verkhoyansk gives its name to the Verkhoyansk Range, one of the main mountainous zones of the Eastern Siberian System. The town is located close to the northwestern edge of the Yana-Oymyakon Highlands, a cold and sparsely populated area.

Climate 
Verkhoyansk sees exceptionally low winter temperatures and some of the greatest temperature differences on Earth between summer and winter. Mean monthly temperatures are below freezing from October through April and exceed  from June through August, with the intervening months of May and September constituting very short transitional seasons. Despite being located within the Arctic Circle, Verkhoyansk has an extreme subarctic climate (Köppen climate classification Dfd) dominated much of the year by high pressure. This has the effect of cutting off the region from warming influences in winter and together with a lack of cloud cover leads to extensive heat losses during the cooler months.

Verkhoyansk is one of the places considered the northern Pole of Cold, the other being Oymyakon, located 629 km (391 miles) away by air. On 6 February 1933 however, the temperature at Oymyakon reached , just barely above Verkhoyansk's record. The World Meteorological Organization has recently recognized a temperature of - 69.6°C (-93.3°F) measured in Greenland on 22 December 1991 as the lowest in the Northern Hemisphere. The record was measured at an automatic weather station and was uncovered after nearly 30 years. 

In this area, temperature inversions consistently form in winter due to the extremely cold and dense air of the Siberian High pooling in deep hollows, so that temperatures increase rather than decrease with higher altitude. In Verkhoyansk it sometimes happens that the average minimum temperatures for January, February, and December are below .

It was also the highest temperature above the Arctic Circle ever recorded. Verkhoyansk has never recorded a temperature above freezing between November 10 and March 14.

Verkhoyansk has an extreme latitude temperature anomaly when compared with Røst off the coastline of Norway. Both settlements are on 67°N, although Røst is on average more than  milder during winter. In summer and particularly during July, on the other hand, Verkhoyansk is significantly warmer than its Norwegian counterpart.

Although no month can be described as truly wet, there are strong seasonal differences in precipitation, with the summer being much wetter than the winter. Winter precipitation is extremely light, largely because of the dominance of high pressure at this time of year.

References

Notes

Sources
Official website of the Sakha Republic. Registry of the Administrative-Territorial Divisions of the Sakha Republic. Verkhoyansky District. 

Cities and towns in the Sakha Republic
Populated places of Arctic Russia
Weather extremes of Earth
Populated places established in 1775
Yana basin